A crossing network is an alternative trading system (ATS) that matches buy and sell orders electronically for execution without first routing the order to an exchange or other displayed market, such as an electronic communication network (ECN), which displays a public quote. These broker-dealers employ computerized systems to match buyers and sellers of large blocks of shares without using the stock exchange. Depending on the particular broker-dealer's system and the type of securities traded (e.g., exchange-listed or OTC securities), these crosses could occur at various times during the day, or after the close of trading, and could be priced at the last sale price or some other objective price, such as the midpoint between the bid and offer or the volume weighted average price (VWAP).  The advantage of the crossing network is the ability to execute a large block order without impacting the public quote. Crossing networks tend to be used for highly liquid stocks and offer money managers the advantages of very low commissions (e.g., 1 to 2 cents per share or lower), anonymity for the buying or selling account, and avoidance of market impact (i.e., movements in a stock's price due to an investor's indication of interest).

Examples of crossing networks are Liquidnet, Pipeline, ITG's Posit, ETF One, and Goldman Sachs' SIGMA X.

See also
 Dark liquidity

References

Financial markets